Joel Ademir Pinto Herrera (born 5 June 1980 in Independencia) is a Peruvian footballer who plays as a goalkeeper for Sport Huancayo in the Peruvian Liga 1.

Club career
Joel Pinto began his career with Alianza Lima, joining the club at the age of 17. He made his league debut in Torneo Descentralizado in the final round of the 2000 season. 

He then joined Coopsol Trujillo in 2001. In his time there he competed with Jaime Muro and Pablo Pérez to be the first choice keeper. 

Then in 2003 he had a short spell playing for Deportivo Wanka.

In January 2004 Pinto joined Sport Boys.

International career
Pinto was called up to Peru's national team by Sergio Markarián on September 27, 2012 ahead of their game against Bolivia in La Paz for the 2014 FIFA World Cup qualification campaign. However, Pinto only served as a substitute choice as José Carvallo was picked ahead of him as the starting goalkeeper.

Honours

Club
Alianza Lima
 Torneo Apertura: 2006
 Torneo Descentralizado: 2006

References

1980 births
Living people
Footballers from Lima
Peruvian footballers
Club Alianza Lima footballers
Sport Coopsol Trujillo footballers
Club Deportivo Wanka footballers
Sport Boys footballers
Club Deportivo Universidad César Vallejo footballers
Ayacucho FC footballers
Sport Huancayo footballers
Peruvian Primera División players
Association football goalkeepers